John Menzies Limited is the holding company of Menzies Aviation plc, an aviation services business  providing ground handling, cargo handling, cargo forwarding and into-plane (ITP) fuelling, based in Edinburgh, Scotland.

On 4 August 2022, Agility Logistics acquired the company and announced that it would begin to integrate its operations with its wholly owned subsidiary, National Aviation Services (NAS), and thereby create a new venture, Menzies Aviation.

History
The company was founded by a bookseller, John Menzies, with his first shop in Princes Street, Edinburgh, in 1833. In 1941, the company's branch in Greenock was destroyed in the Greenock Blitz.

Menzies bookshops and newsagents spread across the UK, often located at railway stations. The company acquired other operators such as Wyman & Sons in 1959.

In January 1998, the company closed its principal branch in Edinburgh, although the head office continued to occupy the building. The whole retail operation was sold to WH Smith in May 1998, to enable Menzies to concentrate on its distribution business.

In January 2007, the company merged its newspaper and magazine wholesale distribution businesses in Northern Ireland into a joint venture with Eason & Son, which became known as EM News Distribution; the company acquired the 50% it did not own in May 2017.

On 31 January 2017, Menzies Aviation completed the acquisition of specialist aircraft fueller Aircraft Services International, Inc (ASIG) from BBA Aviation plc for US$202m. After a planned merger between the Menzies Distribution and the DX Group collapsed in August 2017, the company announced, in July 2018, that it had sold the distribution division to private equity company Endless LLP, with the former owner retaining a 10% share in the business.

On 27 March 2020, the company confirmed it had been badly affected by the COVID-19 pandemic and reduced its headcount by over 17,500. The number of flights Menzies handled globally fell by 60% during the second quarter 2020.

In April 2022, it was announced Menzies Aviation had acquired the Santiago-based ground and air cargo handling services company, Agunsa Aviation Services.

On 30 March 2022, Agility Logistics announced that it would acquire the company for £571 million and that it intended to merge its operations with its wholly owned subsidiary, National Aviation Services (NAS). On 4 August 2022, Agility announced that it had completed the acquisition of the company and that it would begin its integration with NSA and thus create a new venture called Menzies Aviation.

In February 2023, it was announced Menzies Aviation had acquired a majority stake the Jamaica-based privately-owned ground and cargo handling company, AJAS Limited.

See also

 Books in the United Kingdom

Notes

References

External links
Official Website

British companies established in 1833
Service companies of Scotland
Companies based in Edinburgh
Aircraft ground handling companies
1833 establishments in Scotland
Defunct retail companies of the United Kingdom
2022 mergers and acquisitions